Abington Senior High School is a three-year co-educational high school in Abington, Pennsylvania, United States. The school was a two-year high school known as Abington South Campus from September 1964 until June 1983. In September 1983, Abington South Campus again became a three-year high school (grades 10 through 12) and eventually changed its name back to Abington Senior High. The 2017-2018 enrollment was 1,808. The principal is Mr. Angelo Berrios. Abington students are leaders in PSSA scores in the state of Pennsylvania and have won technology-oriented awards from Dell and Microsoft. The school is noted for being involved in the landmark supreme court case decision: Abington School District v. Schempp.

Demographics
The 2017–2018 enrollment is 1,808 pupils with 591 in the senior class. The school has 115.60 teachers and a student-teacher ratio of 15.64. The makeup of the student body is: 61.7% White; 22.2% Black; 8.2% Hispanic or Latino, 4.5% Asian, and less than 0.01% Native American or Native Alaskan.   351 students are Free lunch eligible and 23 are eligible for a reduced-price lunch.

Athletics

Abington is a member of the Suburban One League (SOL), National Conference. They are one of the founding members of the SOL, and one of four remaining founding schools.

Abington Senior High School's mascot is a Ghost. The name comes from the late Harold "Red" Grange, a standout professional football player and member of the Pro Football Hall of Fame, who visited the school in 1931, three years after he was petitioned to run for congress as a Republican and refused. He was nicknamed the Galloping Ghost after the sports journalist Grantland Rice wrote a short poem about him.

A streak of fire, a breath of flame
Eluding all who reach and clutch;
A gray ghost thrown into the game
That rival hands may never touch;
A rubber bounding, blasting soul
Whose destination is the goal — Red Grange of Illinois! 
-Grantland Rice-

Many consider the original logo and mascot to look like a Klansman. Grantland Rice was a known racist whose father was a cotton dealer and grandfather a Confederate Veteran. Prior to Grange's nickname becoming the school's mascot in the 1930s, Abington was represented by "The Maroons". Maroon and white have continued to be the school's colors over the past century.

School district
The Abington School District includes eight other schools, the Junior High, which serves grades 7 through 9, and seven elementary schools, which are listed in order by distance from the senior high; Copper Beech, Highland, Roslyn, Overlook, Willow Hill, Rydal, & McKinley.

The Abington School District was involved in a legal case relating to mandatory prayer in school, Abington School District v. Schempp, which was heard by the Supreme Court of the United States on February 27–28, 1963. The ruling handed down on June 17, 1963, decided 8–1 in favor of the respondent, Ellery Schempp, and declared school-sponsored Bible reading in public schools to be an unconstitutional violation of the separation of church and state. The Chief Justice presiding over the case was Earl Warren.

Honors and distinctions
The school was recognized as a Blue Ribbon High School in 1998–99 school year.  Abington was a National Service Learning Leader School in 1998 and 2001.

In 2008–2009, Abington won the "Triple Crown" of awards for public school districts in the United States. In 2008, America's Promise Alliance named Abington one of the "100 Best Communities for Young People" for the third year. Shortly thereafter, Money Magazine/CNN named Abington as one of the "Top 100 Best Places to Live" in America. In its 2009 list of America's Best High Schools, U.S. News & World Report awarded Abington Senior High School a bronze medal.

Future President and then-Senator Barack Obama spoke at Abington Senior High School on October 3, 2008.

Facilities

The school completed construction of a football stadium in 2006.

A 1965 graduate of Abington Senior High School, Stephen A. Schwarzman, announced a 25 million-dollar donation to the high school on February 15, 2018 which is the highest donation to a public school in history.

The few conditions under which Stephen A. Schwarzman consented to donate the money for the renovation project were: renaming the school to Abington Schwarzman High School, proudly displaying his portrait in the building, naming parts of the school after his brothers, and holding the right to review construction plans for the school as well as choosing a new school logo. However, there was an immediate uproar from the residents of the district regarding the renaming of the school in Stephen A. Schwarzman's honor and the idea got shut down at the School Board Meeting on April 10, 2018, under the premise that they refuse to allow big money to influence their community. Instead, the original agreement was revised to simply naming the new science and technology center after Stephen A. Schwarzman. This project broke ground on November 2, 2018. This renovation project when completed will be able to accommodate 9th grade, moving them from Abington Junior High School to the renovated facility.

Notable alumni
 Wayne Ambler, baseball player
Adam Aron,  CEO of AMC Theatres, co-owner of the Philadelphia 76ers
Molly Bair, supermodel
 Amar Bose, chairman and founder of Bose Corporation.                         
 Ashton Carter, United States Secretary of Defense.
 David Christiana, illustrator and author
 Ellie Daniel, Olympic swimming medalist
Maddy Evans, soccer player
 Susan Francia, Olympic rower
 Randy Garber, former professional soccer player
 Eddie George, 1995 Heisman Trophy Winner
 Don Hasenmayer, former Major League Baseball player for Philadelphia Phillies
 Florence LaRue, lead singer of The 5th Dimension
I Michael Leitman, American Surgeon and Dean of Graduate Medical Education for Icahn School of Medicine
Harry (Matt) Meyers, President of Pennsylvania Institute of Technology
Larry Probst, chairman of Electronic Arts and chairman of the United States Olympic Committee 
 Craig Reynolds, football player
 Bob Saget, comedian and television celebrity
 Ellery Schempp, Abington School District v. Schempp, court case that led to the banning of organized prayer in all public schools 
 Stephen A. Schwarzman, founder of the Blackstone Group
 Susan Seidelman, film director
 Jeffrey Sonnenfeld, professor, Yale School of Management
 David Starr, professional wrestler
 Danny Woodburn, actor
 Shawn Wooden, football player
Scott Rapp, Actor <ref Imdb> https://m.imdb.com/name/nm10405165/ 
Actor and producer known for American Detective, Red Notice, The Pure and the Damned and Gotham Knights.

See also
Abington Township High School, about the previous school campus
List of high schools in Pennsylvania

References

External links

 
 Abington Township

Public high schools in Pennsylvania
Schools in Montgomery County, Pennsylvania
1983 establishments in Pennsylvania
Educational institutions established in 1983